Samoa competed at the 2011 World Championships in Athletics from August 27 to September 4 in Daegu, South Korea.
One athlete was
announced to represent the country
in the event.

Results

Men

References

External links
Official local organising committee website
Official IAAF competition website

Nations at the 2011 World Championships in Athletics
World Championships in Athletics
Samoa at the World Championships in Athletics